A special election to the United States House of Representatives for Florida's at-large congressional district was held October 6, 1845.

The winning candidate would serve a less-than-two-year term in the United States House of Representatives to represent Florida in the 29th Congress from October 6, 1845, to March 4, 1847.

The election was initially called for the Whig candidate, Edward Carrington Cabell, and Cabell was seated in the House of Representatives. However, a recount found the winner to actually be the Democratic candidate, William Henry Brockenbrough. Brockenbrough was seated immediately on January 24, 1846.

Background 
In the 1845 congressional election, David Levy Yulee, a Democrat, was elected to the United States House of Representatives. However, Yulee was jointly elected by the Florida Legislature to the United States Senate, and so resigned from the House of Representatives before taking his seat in order to take his seat in the Senate.

Candidates

Democratic

Nominee 

 William Henry Brockenbrough, former territorial senator

Whig

Nominee 

 Edward Carrington Cabell, lawyer

General election

Original results

Recount results

See also 
 1844 and 1845 United States House of Representatives elections
 1846 and 1847 United States House of Representatives elections

References 

1845 at-large
Florida 1845 at-large
Florida
United States House of Representatives
United States House of Representatives 1845 at-large
Special elections to the 29th United States Congress
+